Livelyville is a rural unincorporated community 4 miles from Grapeland in Houston County, Texas.  It was founded around 1850 by Thomas Lively, who later donated land for a cemetery. The town had a school from the 1870s until 1901. A historical marker was placed at the site of the town in 1982.

References

Unincorporated communities in Houston County, Texas
Unincorporated communities in Texas